Gorakshya Rajya Lakshmi Devi (1798–16 December 1816) was the Queen of Girvan Yuddha Bikram Shah, King of Nepal. She was the mother of Rajendra Bikram Shah. She died of smallpox.

References

Nepalese queens consort
1816 deaths
1798 births
Deaths from smallpox
People of the Nepalese unification
18th-century Nepalese people
18th-century Nepalese nobility
19th-century Nepalese nobility
Nepalese Hindus
Queen mothers